Rieste is a municipality in the district of Osnabrück, in Lower Saxony, Germany.

Mayor
In November 2011 Sebastian Hüdepohl was elected the new mayor. He is the successor of Anton Harms, who was in office since 1996.

References

External links
 

Osnabrück (district)